Legacy of Sound is an Australian band, formed in New South Wales in the 1990s. It was a musical project of Mick Cardy, who still promotes music under the same name. Cardy is based in the Blue Mountains of New South Wales, Australia.

Mick Cardy
Mick Cardy is an instrumental composer, independent artist who has collaborated with a variety of vocalists and musicians covering various musical styles.

Mick promotes his own instrumental music and collaborative works through means such as radio airplay and internet sites, e.g. Facebook, YouTube, Myspace and Twitter.

All promotions of his original music is done through Aural Ecstasy Records, an independent record label Cardy has set up with the intention of promoting Legacy of Sound and associates.

Cardy has been releasing music under the name Legacy of Sound since 1992.  To date, Legacy of Sound has released fourteen (14) CDs and has more than one hundred songs registered with APRA. Legacy of Sound have over fifty videos on the internet.

History

Early years 
In the late 1990s, Legacy of Sound relocated to Newcastle in New South Wales, an area rich in original music talent. In collaboration with drummer David Larsen, Cardy opened the Legacy of Sound Music Studio.

In 2001, Aural Ecstasy Records was set up by Cardy to primarily promote the musical works of Legacy of Sound. It is an independent label.

In 2004, Cardy collaborated with vocal aggressor Mazen Sawaqed on his metal/electronica album In Sin You Wait, inspired by bands such as Fear Factory and White Zombie, known in metal for their use of samples and drum machines.

In 2005, Legacy of Sound released Divine Symmetry, a collection of softer electronica songs in contrast to their previous release In Sin You Wait.

From 2005 to 2011, Legacy of Sound did not release any new material, although a double CD of all previously released 'singles' that were promoted to radio stations from 1992 to 1999 was produced, named The Singles.

Legal issues 
In 1993, another band called Legacy of Sound, originating from Sweden, had some success with a song called Happy.  They began promoting in Australia through their record company BMG.

Cardy made attempts to contact them as he was trading under that name prior to their existence, attempting to get them to use another name in Australia. This is not an unusual thing for bands. All attempts by Mick were ignored by the band's manager, Mr. Alan Kress, and record company so he applied for a trade mark to protect his name and music (He already had a registered business name for Legacy of Sound).

After applying for a trade mark (Legacy of Sound), the Trade Marks Commission had no opposition to the application, so they advertised their intention to grant the Trade Mark, allowing any interested party to oppose the decision before it was ratified.

At this point, attorneys for Sony Music opposed the trade mark. They said that it was infringing on a trade mark owned by Sony called "Legacy", a name they used to re-release older catalogues of music. Their argument was that Mick Cardy might profit from using his trade mark Legacy of Sound if it were to be granted.

Therefore, the issue was to be heard before a trade marks representative. Mick Cardy represented himself due to the high cost of a patent attorney and was to argue his case against patent attorneys for Sony Music. He lost his case, but fortunately, Mick had two trade mark applications, as he had to have one for "Goods" and one for "Services" as they are seen as separate under the Trade Marks Act, ("Goods" representing physical items such as CDs and "Services" representing performances) So even though Sony were successful in winning their case, Mick Cardy still received registration of his trade mark "Legacy of Sound" as a "Service" under the Act.

Hiatus and later years 
After a long hiatus, Cardy returned to composing, returning to some of his older songs and reworking them with the advantage of the digital domain. Released in May 2011, Dance Under the Midnight Sun covered a mixture of electronica and simple rock instrumentals. Another feature of this album was that it was the first time Cardy played drums.

During 2013, Mick Cardy advertised for vocalists, inviting them to collaborate on songs. After numerous replies, three vocalists proved successful, bringing forth the album entitled Et al, (the Latin term for 'and others') The album was released in March 2014.

After the release of Et al, Legacy of Sound were involved in various musical projects, such as playing with the rock pop band Positive Spin, who are still promoting their original music with occasional live shows in the Blue Mountains region. Also, a long term effort was being made to create another metal album with Mazen Sawaqed on vocals. Legacy of Sound also tried to encourage collaborations with other musicians to try and develop a psychedelic experimental, free form type of band.  One such collaboration was the band Ashula, created with local artist John Moran; a couple of live shows were done locally.

In November 2019, Legacy of Sound released their 14th CD, "A Minor Encounter." It is a collection of compositions written as far back as the early 90's. Instrumental pieces were created on acoustic guitar.

References

Australian musical groups
1992 establishments in Australia